The 1972 Speedway World Team Cup was the 13th edition of the FIM Speedway World Team Cup to determine the team world champions.

The final took place at the Olching Speedwaybahn in Olching, West Germany. The title was won by Great Britain for the third time.

Qualifying
SCANDINAVIAN ROUND
 25 June
  Sandnes

Austria awarded 2nd.place because they had more heat winners than Hungary (2 to 0)
East Germany  withdrew. Replaced by Scandinavian Select who were ineligible to qualify for the next round

World Final
 24 September
  Olching, Olching Speedwaybahn

World final
 24 September
  Olching Speedwaybahn

Run-off for silver
Soviet Union 7 (Kalmykov 3, Kuzmin 2, Khlinovsky 1, Trofimov 1) bt Poland 5 (Waloszek 3, Plech 2, Glücklich 0, Dobrucki 0)

See also
 1972 Individual Speedway World Championship
 1972 Speedway World Pairs Championship

References

World Team
Speedway World Team Cup